Claudia Verdicchio-Krause (born 24 May 1975 in Freiburg) is a German female sport shooter. At the 2012 Summer Olympics, she competed in the Women's 10 metre air pistol and the Women's 25 metre pistol, finishing 20th in the 10 metre event and 26th in the 50 metre event.

References

External links 
 
 
 
 

1975 births
Living people
German female sport shooters
Olympic shooters of Germany
Shooters at the 2004 Summer Olympics
Shooters at the 2008 Summer Olympics
Shooters at the 2012 Summer Olympics
Sportspeople from Freiburg im Breisgau